Llangammarch Wells or simply Llangammarch is a village in the community of Llangamarch in Powys, Wales, lying on the Afon Irfon, and in the historic county of Brecknockshire (Breconshire).

It is the smallest of the four spa villages of mid-Wales, alongside  Llandrindod Wells, Builth Wells and Llanwrtyd Wells. The spa was focused on a barium well, which is now closed.
The old village is centred on the parish church of St Cadmarch, which is a grade II* listed building.

Llangammarch station is on the Heart of Wales Line with trains provided by Transport for Wales. It lies on Route 43 of the National Cycle Network.

Llangammarch Wells Golf Club (now defunct) was founded in 1904. The club and course disappeared in the 1950s.

The community includes the small settlements of Tirabad and Cefn Gorwydd, birthplace of John Penry (1563 – 29 May 1593) the martyr, who was born at Cefn Brith farm. The farm is signposted but the old farmhouse is not the original building.

Governance
For elections to Powys County Council, Llangamarch is covered by the Llanwrtyd Wells electoral ward.

Notable people 
 John Penry (1563–1593), executed for high treason during the reign of Queen Elizabeth I, is Wales' most famous Protestant Separatist martyr.
 Thomas Howell (1588–1650), clergyman and Bishop of Bristol from 1644 to 1646.
 T. Harri Jones (1921–1965), a Welsh poet and university lecturer, commemorated by a statue in the town

See also
 Llangammarch (parish)

References

External links
 new Village Website
Llangammarch History Society Website
 Local Artists and Artisans Group
Photos of Llangammarch Wells and surrounding area on geograph
Llangamarch at genuki.org

Spa towns in Wales
Villages in Powys